City of London by-election, 1906  may refer to:
February 1906 City of London by-election
June 1906 City of London by-election